Aspects of the Novel is a book compiled from a series of lectures delivered by E. M. Forster at Trinity College, Cambridge, in 1927, in which he discussed the English language novel. By using examples from classic texts, he highlights the seven universal aspects of the novel: story, characters, plot, fantasy, prophecy, pattern, and rhythm.

Some critics have taken issue with the fact that Forster, as a renowned novelist, formulated a normative theory of how to write prose. W. Somerset Maugham commented that, having read the book, "I learned that the only way to write novels was like Mr. E. M. Forster." Virginia Woolf, reviewing Aspects of the Novel in Nation and Athenaeum, on the other hand, praised some aspects of the book. According to Woolf, Forster, unlike other male critics, never exercises stern authority to save the lady (i.e. fiction), he merely acts as a casual friend who happens to have been admitted into the bedroom. Woolf concedes, however, that this is ultimately not very helpful when it comes to formulating rules: "So then we are back in the old bog; nobody knows anything about the laws of fiction".

Chapters
The book has nine chapters:

 Introductory
 The Story
 The People
 The People (continued)
 The Plot
 Fantasy
 Prophecy
 Pattern and Rhythm 
 Conclusion

References

Notes

 Oliver Stallybrass, 'Editor's Introduction', in Aspects of the Novel (Penguin Books, 1980)

External links
 Full text of Aspects of the Novel at the Internet Archive

1927 non-fiction books
Books about literature